Francisco de Rojas Zorrilla (4 October 1607 – 23 January 1648) was a Spanish dramatist. The main pieces of Rojas Zorrilla are Del rey abajo ninguno and No hay padre siendo rey (both published in the 1640s).

Biography
Rojas Zorrilla was born at Toledo. He became a knight of Santiago in 1644. It is believed that he studied at the University of Toledo and University of Salamanca, and for a time followed a military career.
His plays were published between 1640 and 1645; his greatest dramatic composition, Del rey abajo ninguno, was printed separately under the title of García del Castañar.

His works were adapted by authors outside Spain. No hay padre siendo rey was borrowed by Jean Rotrou for his Venceslas. Donde hay agravios no hay zelos and the Amo criado were imitated by Paul Scarron in his Jodelet Souffleté and Maître Valet. Entre Bobos anda el juego was the source of Thomas Corneille's Don Bertrand de Cigarral, as well as of Scarron's Don Japhel d'Arménie. Four foreign works derive from Obligados y ofendidos: Les Généreux Ennemis by François le Metel de Boisrobert, Les Illustres Ennemis by Thomas Corneille, Scarron's Écolier de Salamanque, and the story of Count Belflor and Leonor de Cespedes in Alain-René Lesage's novel Le Diable boiteux (1707). La traición busca el castigo is the basis of John Vanbrugh's False Friend and Lesage's Traître puni.

Works in English translation
La traición busca el castigo –  (a free adaptation)
Del Rey Abajo Ninguno ("None Beneath the King") – in 
Los áspides de Cleopatra ("Cleopatra") – in

Notes

References

1607 births
1648 deaths
People from Toledo, Spain
Spanish dramatists and playwrights
Spanish male dramatists and playwrights
University of Salamanca alumni